The State I Am In is a 2000 German drama film directed by Christian Petzold.

Plot

Fifteen-year-old Jeanne lives in Portugal with her parents, Hans and Clara, who are former members of a left-wing terrorist group. When their true identities are uncovered, they flee the country to seek shelter back in their native Germany. As Hans and Clara contend with their own relationship issues and seek safe haven through the help of former comrades, Jeanne begins to pose a threat to their immediate safety with her rebellious actions: shoplifting, sneaking into a film showing at a local school, and pursuing a relationship with a boy she met on the beach in Portugal.

Cast

 Julia Hummer as Jeanne
 Barbara Auer as Clara
 Richy Müller as Hans
 Rogério Jacques as Dieb
 Günther Maria Halmer as Klaus
 Bilge Bingul as Heinrich

Production

Petzold and co-writer Harun Farocki reportedly took inspiration from the life of Wolfgang Grams, a former member of the Red Army Faction. They initially began writing the script in 1997, but struggled to find funding due to the portrayal of former members of the RAF. They were advised to remove these aspects of the plot in order to secure funding.

The State I Am In forms a loose trilogy with Petzold's later films Gespenster and Yella. Some have noted the plot's similarity to Sidney Lumet's Running on Empty.

Themes

Petzold has stated that the film is, in part, his criticism of cinema for being incapable of dealing with contemporary issues, which is reflected in the initial issues with finding funding. Much of the plot is concerned with the family being on the run as a result of political actions from two decades prior, and how German society has changed in the intervening period. In one scene, a character digs up a buried cache of outdated Deutsche Marks, no longer legal tender following the fall of the Berlin Wall, and he dismisses them as a "history lesson". In one scene, Jeanne joins a school group watching Alain Resnais's Holocaust documentary Night and Fog. The lack of response from the class, along with Jeanne's disinterest in her parents' cause, has been read as a comment on German culture's disengagement with politics.

Reception

The film won the awards for best film and best editing at the German Film Critics Association Awards. It also won best screenplay at the Thessaloniki and grand prize at Valenciennes film festivals.

It received generally positive reviews on release. Writing in Variety, David Stratton described it as "a modest but potent suspense drama that realistically depicts an off-kilter way of life." Andreas Kern of Screen Daily wrote that Petzold's "subtle and quietly approach hits home in a no nonsense way by dissecting the lives of his protagonists." The Guardian Andrew Pulver was more mixed in his review from the 2001 Edinburgh Film Festival, noting that the film "is laudable on many levels" but ultimately "what makes the film hard going...is the way it asks us to spend 100 minutes in the company of such resolutely unlikable individuals."

References

External links

2000 films
2000s German-language films
2000 drama films
German drama films
Films directed by Christian Petzold
Cultural depictions of the Red Army Faction
Films shot in the Algarve
2000s German films